Sultan Bathery temple, originally known as Ganapathi Vattam, is a famous Jain temple located at Sultan Bathery, earlier known as Kidanganad town of Kerala.

About temple 
The Sultan Bathery temple originally known as, Ganapathi Vattam, was constructed in the 13th century CE by Jains migrated to the region from Tamil Nadu and Karnataka. The temple was built during the reign of Vijayanagara empire. The temple is a 25 x 7.5 x 4 meter structure that features ornate columns and a stone slabs roof. The temple was an important Jain center until, the temple was invaded and later used it to keep his battery (ammunition store)) by Tipu Sultan, of Kingdom of Mysore, in the 18th century. The temple is part of Jain circuit of Kerala.

The temple is a protected monument under the Archaeological Survey of India.

Gallery

See also 

 Jainism in Kerala

References

Citations

Sources 
 
 
 

Jain temples in Kerala
13th-century Jain temples
Religious buildings and structures in Wayanad district
Tourist attractions in Wayanad district
13th-century architecture